This article is about the particular significance of the year 1798 to Wales and its people.

Incumbents
Lord Lieutenant of Anglesey – Henry Paget 
Lord Lieutenant of Brecknockshire and Monmouthshire – Henry Somerset, 5th Duke of Beaufort
Lord Lieutenant of Caernarvonshire – Thomas Bulkeley, 7th Viscount Bulkeley
Lord Lieutenant of Cardiganshire – Wilmot Vaughan, 1st Earl of Lisburne
Lord Lieutenant of Carmarthenshire – John Vaughan  
Lord Lieutenant of Denbighshire – Sir Watkin Williams-Wynn, 5th Baronet    
Lord Lieutenant of Flintshire – Lloyd Kenyon, 1st Baron Kenyon 
Lord Lieutenant of Glamorgan – John Stuart, 1st Marquess of Bute 
Lord Lieutenant of Merionethshire - Sir Watkin Williams-Wynn, 5th Baronet
Lord Lieutenant of Montgomeryshire – George Herbert, 2nd Earl of Powis
Lord Lieutenant of Pembrokeshire – Richard Philipps, 1st Baron Milford
Lord Lieutenant of Radnorshire – Thomas Harley

Bishop of Bangor – John Warren
Bishop of Llandaff – Richard Watson
Bishop of St Asaph – Lewis Bagot
Bishop of St Davids – William Stuart

Events
March - Historian William Richards returns from Wales to King's Lynn.
31 March - George Herbert, 2nd Earl of Powis, becomes Lord Lieutenant of Shropshire;
June/August - Clogwyn Du'r Arddu is climbed by Peter Bailey Williams and William Bingley, botanists looking for alpine plants on Snowdon.
13 July - William Wordsworth, visiting Wales, writes "Lines composed a few miles above Tintern Abbey on revisiting the banks of the Wye during a tour".
17 October - First recorded use of the word "tramroad", in the minutes of the Brecon and Abergavenny Canal Company.
unknown dates
The Gwyneddigion Society launches its project of publishing ancient Welsh manuscripts.
William Lort Mansel becomes Master of Trinity College, Cambridge.
William Madocks buys the Tan-yr-Allt estate on Traeth Mawr.
Morgan John Rhys buys a tract of land in the Allegheny mountains of North America for the purpose of founding a Welsh colony, which he names Cambria.

Arts and literature

New books
Emily Clark - Ianthé, or the Flower of Caernarvon
Thomas Roberts of Llwyn'rhudol - Cwyn yn erbyn Gorthrymder
Hester Thrale - Three Warnings to John Bull before he dies. By an Old Acquaintance of the Public
Richard Warner - Second Walk Through Wales

Music
Edward Jones (Bardd y Brenin) - Popular Cheshire Melodies

Births
3 August - Llewelyn Lewellin, first principal of St David's College, Lampeter (died 1878)
16 August - Alfred Ollivant, Bishop of Llandaff (died 1882)
date unknown - John Jones Archdeacon of Bangor (died 1863)

Deaths
21 June - Edward Evan, poet, 81
6 July - Joshua Evans, Quaker minister of Welsh descent, 66
17 November - George Cadogan Morgan, dissenting minister and scientist, 44
23 November - David Samwell (Dafydd Ddu Feddyg), naval surgeon and poet, 47
16 December - Thomas Pennant, naturalist and travel writer, 72

References

 
 Wales